David Barlow may refer to:

 David Barlow (basketball) (born 1983), Australian basketball player
 David Barlow (Coronation Street), a fictional character in the British soap Coronation Street
 David Barlow (judge) (born 1971), United States Attorney for the district of Utah
 David Barlow (biologist), British biologist and filmmaker
 David H. Barlow (born 1942), American psychologist